Alessia Bulleri (born 19 July 1993) is an Italian road and cyclo-cross cyclist, who currently rides for UCI Women's Continental Team  in road cycling, and UCI Cyclo-cross Team Cycling Café Racing Team in cyclo-cross. She represented her nation in the women's elite event at the 2016 UCI Cyclo-cross World Championships  in Heusden-Zolder.

References

External links

1993 births
Living people
Cyclo-cross cyclists
Italian female cyclists
Place of birth missing (living people)
Cyclists at the 2010 Summer Youth Olympics
Sportspeople from the Province of Livorno
Cyclists from Tuscany